Centennial Bridge was a historic stone arch bridge located in Center Valley, Pennsylvania in the Lehigh Valley region of eastern Pennsylvania. It was built in 1876, and was a  bridge, with three , horseshoe shaped arches.  It crossed Saucon Creek.

The bridge was listed on the National Register of Historic Places in 1988. It was demolished in 2013.

See also
List of bridges documented by the Historic American Engineering Record in Pennsylvania

References

External links

Road bridges on the National Register of Historic Places in Pennsylvania
Historic American Engineering Record in Pennsylvania
Bridges completed in 1876
Bridges in Lehigh County, Pennsylvania
National Register of Historic Places in Lehigh County, Pennsylvania
Stone arch bridges in the United States